Forest of the Gods (Lithuanian: Dievų miškas) is a 2005 film, directed by Algimantas Puipa, based on the Balys Sruoga novel of the same name, published originally in 1957.

Plot 

This story is about one man — who is an artist and an intellectual — he was imprisoned by two brutal regimes, the Nazis and the Soviets. 'The Professor' is a man who lives by his own personal version of the Ten Commandments. After miraculously surviving imprisonment in a Nazi concentration camp through a bit of ironic fate, he writes a memoir of his life, which becomes the target of the Soviet censors.

Reception 
The film  became the most profitable film released after Lithuania restored its independence.

The 98-year-old Vladislovas Telksnys, the only Lithuanian survivor of the Stutthof concentration camp in 2013, referred to the movie as "a piece of nonsense". In particular he referred to the scene depicting a Gestapo officer marching and a woman with an umbrella following behind. According to Telksnys, "there were no such things".

References

External links 
 
 

2005 films
2005 drama films
Lithuanian drama films
British war drama films
Lithuanian-language films
British World War II films
Holocaust films
Films set in Poland
Baltic states World War II films
2000s British films
Works based on Lithuanian novels